Richard Sydnor  was the Receiver and Steward of Bishop Oldham of Exeter Cathedral from 10 Henry VII (1505) to 5 Henry VIII (1514) - see Exeter Cathedral MS. 3690.

He was Archdeacon of Cornwall in 1515 and then Archdeacon of Totnes from 1515 to 1534.

In 1519 he was appointed Canon of the tenth stall at St George's Chapel, Windsor Castle, a position he held until 1534.

References

Archdeacons of Totnes
Archdeacons of Cornwall
Canons of Windsor
16th-century English clergy